Sassen–Bünsow Land National Park lies on Spitsbergen island in the Svalbard archipelago, Norway. The park was opened in 2003 and includes both glaciers and several glacially carved valleys.  The sealer/whaler Hilmar Nøis built the hunting station Fredheim on the north side of the Sassen river outlet in this area.  One of Spitsbergen's highest waterfalls lies in Eskerdalen (Esker Valley) inside the park.

External links
  Norwegian Directorate for Nature Management on Sassen-Bünsow Land National Park

National parks of Svalbard
Protected areas established in 2003
2003 establishments in Norway
Spitsbergen